KDOX may refer to:

 KDOX (FM), a radio station (91.3 FM) licensed to serve Big Pine, California, United States
 KQLL, a radio station (1280 AM) licensed to serve Henderson, Nevada, United States, which held the call sign KDOX from 1998 to 2011